was a Japanese waka poet of the mid-Heian period. One of his poems was included in the Ogura Hyakunin Isshu.

Biography 

After serving as governor of several provinces, in 947 he was appointed .

Poetry 
Four of his poems were included in Gosen Wakashū on.

The following poem by him was included as No. 39 in Fujiwara no Teika's Ogura Hyakunin Isshu:

References

Bibliography 
 
McMillan, Peter. 2010 (1st ed. 2008). One Hundred Poets, One Poem Each. New York: Columbia University Press.
Suzuki Hideo, Yamaguchi Shin'ichi, Yoda Yasushi. 2009 (1st ed. 1997). Genshoku: Ogura Hyakunin Isshu. Tokyo: Bun'eidō.

External links 
Minamoto no Hitoshi on Kotobank.

10th century in Japan
10th-century Japanese poets
People of Heian-period Japan
Minamoto clan
Japanese nobility
Articles containing Japanese poems
Hyakunin Isshu poets